John Lumley may refer to:
 John L. Lumley, Professor Emeritus, Graduate Professor of Mechanical Engineering and Aerospace Engineering
John Lumley, 1st Baron Lumley  (c. 1533 – 1609), English book and art collector
John Lumley (Arundel MP) (c. 1703 – 1739), British Army officer and politician
John Stuart Penton Lumley, former professor of Vascular Surgery at the University of London
John Lumley (real tennis), British real tennis player

See also
John Lumley-Savile (disambiguation)